Jennings Township is one of nine townships in Fayette County, Indiana. As of the 2010 census, its population was 830 and it contained 360 housing units.

History
Jennings Township was established in 1819. It was named for Jonathan Jennings, who was acting governor at the time of the township's organization.

Geography

Unincorporated towns
 Alquina
 Lyonsville

Adjacent townships
 Waterloo Township (north)
 Brownsville Township, Union County (northeast)
 Liberty Township, Union County (east)
 Harmony Township, Union County (southeast)
 Jackson Township (southwest)
 Connersville Township (west)

Major highways
 Indiana State Road 1
 Indiana State Road 44

Cemeteries
The township contains three cemeteries: Mount Garrison, Simpson and Union. There is also at least one other small cemetery along Village Creek, the Burk Cemetery.

References
 
 United States Census Bureau cartographic boundary files

External links
 Indiana Township Association
 United Township Association of Indiana

Townships in Fayette County, Indiana
Townships in Indiana